Colin Smythe (born 1942) is a bibliographer of W.B.Yeats and other Irish authors and literary agent. He is also a publisher, having founded his publishing house in 1966, and is based in Buckinghamshire, England.

Smythe published the first five Terry Pratchett novels and later acted as Pratchett's agent. In 1971, Smythe published Konstantin Raudive's Breakthrough, the first book in the English language on the Electronic Voice Phenomenon (EVP) and the inspiration for the film White Noise. Other authors published include George Moore, Lady Gregory and Oliver St John Gogarty.

See also
Peter Bander van Duren

References

British publishers (people)
Literary agents
Living people
1942 births